Michael Taremwa Kananura, is a Ugandan accountant and corporate executive who was appointed as the Chief Executive Officer (CEO) in acting capacity, at Uganda Electricity Transmission Company Limited (UETCL), effective 10 August 2022. Before his new assignment, he worked as the chief financial officer, at UETCL.

Background and education
Kananura is a Ugandan national. He holds a Bachelor of Commerce degree from Makerere University, Uganda's oldest and largest public university. His Master of Philosophy degree in Development Finance was awarded by the University of Stellenbosch, in South Africa. He is a Fellow of the Association of Chartered Certified Accountants (FCCA) of the United Kingdom and a member of the Institute of Certified Public Accountants of Uganda (ICPA). He also holds a Bachelor of Laws degree from Cavendish University Uganda. In addition, he holds a Diploma in Tax Planning and Tax Administration.

Career
His business experience goes back almost 20 years, as of 2022.
He spent several years working for ActionAid Uganda and ActionAid Zambia, in managerial positions. In May 2012, he transferred to the Uganda Revenue Authority. He spent there almost eight years, rising to the level of Manager of Regulatory Finance.

He was then hired by Uganda Electricity Distribution Company Limited (UEDCL), working as the chief financial officer, for two years. He was then hired by UETCL, working first as the Manager Finance Accounts and Sales before being promoted to CFO.

At UETCL, Kananura replaced George Rwabajungu, who was relieved of his duties as managing director and CEO. In the management changes, announced by board chairman Kwame Ejalu, the board also selected a new acting deputy CEO, Richard Matsiko, who replaced Valentine Katabira, who retired.

See also
 Harrison Mutikanga
 Ziria Tibalwa Waako

References

External links
 UETCL Official Webpage

Living people
1980s births
Ugandan accountants
Ugandan chief executives
Ugandan business executives
Makerere University alumni
Stellenbosch University alumni
Cavendish University Uganda alumni
People from Western Region, Uganda